The 2020–21 Polish Cup was the 67th season of the annual Polish football knockout tournament. It began on 8 August 2020 with the first matches of the preliminary round and ended with the final on 2 May 2021 at Arena Lublin. The 2020–21 edition of the Polish Cup was sponsored by Fortuna, making the official name Fortuna Puchar Polski. Winners of the competition qualified for the second qualifying round of the 2021–22 UEFA Europa Conference League.

The defending champions Cracovia were eliminated by Raków Częstochowa in the semi-finals. Raków won the final 2–1 against Arka Gdynia, achieving their first Polish Cup title ever.

Participating teams

Notes
 Gryf Wejherowo was excluded from the competition.

Prize money
The PZPN Board of Directors determined the size of the prizes at its meeting on April 27, 2020.

Round and draw dates

Preliminary round
The matches were played on 8 and 9 August 2020. Participating in this round were the 8 lowest ranked teams from 2019–20 II liga (which finished 2019–20 season on positions 11-18). With reference to the competition regulations, the matches were played according to the following scheme: 11th team of 2019–20 season will be a host of match against 18th team, 12th team will be a host of match against 17th team, 13th team will be a host of match against 16th team, 14th team will be a host of match against 15th team.

|-
! colspan="3" style="background:cornsilk;"|8 August 2020

|-
! colspan="3" style="background:cornsilk;"|9 August 2020

|}
Notes
Note 1: Gryf Wejherowo was excluded from the competition.

Round of 64
The draw for this round was conducted in the headquarter of PZPN on 27 July 2020. The matches were played from 13 August to 2 September 2020. Participating in this round were the 4 winners from the previous round, 16 teams from the 2019–20 Ekstraklasa, 18 teams from the 2019–20 I liga, 10 highest ranked teams from 2019–20 II liga and 16 winners of the regional cup competitions. Games were hosted by teams playing in the lower division in the 2020–21 season or by first drawn teams in a case of match between clubs from the same division.

! colspan="3" style="background:cornsilk;"|13 August 2020

|-
! colspan="3" style="background:cornsilk;"|14 August 2020

|-
! colspan="3" style="background:cornsilk;"|15 August 2020

|-
! colspan="3" style="background:cornsilk;"|16 August 2020

|-
! colspan="3" style="background:cornsilk;"|19 August 2020

|-
! colspan="3" style="background:cornsilk;"|21 August 2020

|-
! colspan="3" style="background:cornsilk;"|22 August 2020

|-
! colspan="3" style="background:cornsilk;"|23 August 2020

|-
! colspan="3" style="background:cornsilk;"|25 August 2020

|-
! colspan="3" style="background:cornsilk;"|2 September 2020

|}

Round of 32
The draw for this round was conducted in the headquarter of PZPN on 11 September 2020. The matches should be originally played from 29 October to 4 November 2020, but due to COVID-19 disease several of games were postponed. Finally first match of this round has been played on 30 October 2020 and last game has been played on 2 December 2020. Participating in this round were the 32 winners from the previous round. Games were hosted by teams playing in the lower division in the 2020–21 season or by first drawn teams in a case of match between clubs from the same division.

! colspan="3" style="background:cornsilk;"|30 October 2020

|-
! colspan="3" style="background:cornsilk;"|31 October 2020

|-
! colspan="3" style="background:cornsilk;"|2 November 2020

|-
! colspan="3" style="background:cornsilk;"|3 November 2020

|-
! colspan="3" style="background:cornsilk;"|4 November 2020

|-
! colspan="3" style="background:cornsilk;"|14 November 2020

|-
! colspan="3" style="background:cornsilk;"|17 November 2020

|-
! colspan="3" style="background:cornsilk;"|20 November 2020

|-
! colspan="3" style="background:cornsilk;"|25 November 2020

|-
! colspan="3" style="background:cornsilk;"|1 December 2020

|-
! colspan="3" style="background:cornsilk;"|2 December 2020

|}

Round of 16
Participating in this round were the 16 winners from the previous round. The draw for this round was conducted in the headquarter of PZPN on 8 December 2020. Games were hosted by teams playing in the lower division in the 2020–21 season or by first drawn teams in a case of match between clubs from the same division. The games were played on 9-16 February 2021.

! colspan="3" style="background:cornsilk;"|9 February 2021

|-
! colspan="3" style="background:cornsilk;"|10 February 2021

|-
! colspan="3" style="background:cornsilk;"|11 February 2021

|-
! colspan="3" style="background:cornsilk;"|16 February 2021

|}

Quarter-finals
Participating in this round were the 8 winners from the previous round. The draw for this round was conducted in the PZPN headquarter on 12 February 2021. Games were hosted by teams playing in the lower division in the 2020–21 season or by first drawn teams in a case of match between clubs from the same division. The games were played on 2 and 3 March 2021.

! colspan="3" style="background:cornsilk;"|2 March 2021

|-
! colspan="3" style="background:cornsilk;"|3 March 2021

|}

Semi-finals
Participating in this round are the 4 winners from the previous round. The draw for this round was conducted in the PZPN headquarter on 4 March 2021. Games will be hosted by teams playing in the lower division in the 2020–21 season or by first drawn teams in a case of match between clubs from the same division. The games will be played on 7 and 14 April 2021.

! colspan="3" style="background:cornsilk;"|7 April 2021

|-
! colspan="3" style="background:cornsilk;"|14 April 2021

|}

Final

Notes

References

Polish Cup
Cup
Polish Cup seasons